Bartholomew John (born 24 August 1952 in Christchurch, New Zealand) is an actor best known for his roles on television in America and Australia. In 1974, his single "Someone" peaked at number 75 in Australia.

Career 
He played Dr. Chris Piper in the Australian soap opera The Young Doctors from 1977 to 1979 followed by a lead role in Skyways from 1979 to 1981 as Captain Nick Granger, also appearing in Waterloo Station. More recent credits include: Murder Call, All Saints and Always Greener. His best-known work is probably playing the clown, Ronald McDonald on Australian television.

In 2005 John portrayed John Forsythe in Dynasty: The Making of a Guilty Pleasure, a fictionalized television movie based on the creation and behind the scenes production of the 1980s prime time soap opera Dynasty.

References

External links
 

1952 births
Living people
New Zealand male television actors
Australian male television actors